

The CSIR SARA II (SARA - South African Research Autogyro) is a South African two-seat experimental autogyro designed and built by the Aeronautics Research Unit of the Council for Scientific and Industrial Research.

Development
As part of the support to South African aircraft manufacturing industry the ARU developed a single-seat autogyro as a research vehicle. Design of the autogyro was started in 1965 and construction followed in April 1967, by 1972 the autogyro, registered ZS-UGL, was ready for tethered tests mounted on a lorry-platform, it made its first free flight on 30 November 1972 at Swartkop Air Force Base. Following the test flights the autogyro was modified.

Design
The autogyro had a box-like fuselage structure made from light-alloy and was fitted with twin fins and rudders with a fixed incidence tail-plane mounted between them. It was fitted with a two-bladed teetering rotor, the rotor could be spun up using a shaft drive through a clutch from the engine. The engine located at the rear was a  Continental O-360-A air-cooled engine driving a two-bladed constant-speed pusher propeller. The crew sat side by side in the enclosed fuselage with dual controls, entrance is through a forward-opening glazed door on each side. The landing gear was a fixed tricycle type with a self-centering and steerable nosewheel.

Specifications

See also

References

Notes

Bibliography

1970s South African experimental aircraft
Single-engined pusher autogyros
Aircraft first flown in 1972